Nicolas Torres may refer to:

 Nicky Torres (born 1987) Argentinian footballer, who may be referred to as Nicolás Torres
 Nicolás Torres (footballer, born 1983), Argentinian footballer
 Nicolás Torres (BMX cyclist)